Brotia costula is a species of gastropod belonging to the family Pachychilidae. 

This species is found in Southeastern Asia.

Synonyms
 Brotia (Brotia) costula (Rafinesque, 1833)
 Brotia (Brotia) costula costula (Rafinesque, 1833)
 Brotia (Brotia) costula varicosa (Troschel, 1837)
 Brotia variabilis (Benson, 1836) (based on an unavailable name)
 Melania (Melanoides) soloensis K. Martin, 1905 † (junior subjective synonym)
 Melania (Melanoides) variabilis Benson, 1836 (superseded combination)
 Melania (Melanoides) variabilis var. microstoma G. Nevill, 1885 (original combination)
 Melania (Melanoides) variabilis var. pseudospinosa G. Nevill, 1885 (superseded combination)
 Melania (Melanoides) variabilis var. semilaevigata G. Nevill, 1885 (original combination)
 Melania (Melanoides) variabilis var. subspinosa G. Nevill, 1885 (original combination)
 Melania (Melanoides) variabilis var. subtuberculata G. Nevill, 1885 (original combination)
 Melania (Melanoides) variabilis var. subvaricosa G. Nevill, 1885 (original combination)
 Melania carolinae Gray in Griffith & Pidgeon, 1833 (junior synonym)
 Melania costula Rafinesque, 1833 (original combination)
 Melania hainesiana I. Lea, 1857
 Melania indica Souleyet, 1852 (junior synonym)
 Melania menkeana "Brot, 1875" (incorrect subsequent spelling of Melania menkiana; not qualifying as an emendation)
 Melania menkeana G. Nevill, 1885 (unjustified emendation of Melania menkiana I. Lea, 1843)
 Melania menkiana I. Lea, 1843 (junior synonym)
 Melania meukiana I. Lea, 1843 (incorrect original spelling; Melania menkiana is an emendation)
 Melania plicata I. Lea, 1838 (invalid: junior homonym of Melania plicata Menke, 1828; M. menkiana is a replacement name)
 Melania spinosa Hanley, 1854 (junior synonym)
 Melania variabilis Benson, 1836 (invalid: junior homonym of Melania variabilis Defrance, 1823)
 Melania variabilis var. aspera Hanley & Theobald, 1874 (invalid: junior homonym of Melania aspera Lesson, 1831)
 Melania variabilis var. cincta Hanley & Theobald, 1874 (invalid: junior homonym of Melania cincta I. Lea & H. C. Lea, 1851)
 Melania variabilis var. microstoma G. Nevill, 1885 (invalid: junior homonym of Melania microstoma I. Lea & H. C. Lea, 1851)
 Melania variabilis var. pseudospinosa G. Nevill, 1885 (junior synonym)
 Melania variabilis var. semilaevigata G. Nevill, 1885 (junior synonym)
 Melania variabilis var. subspinosa G. Nevill, 1885 (junior synonym)
 Melania variabilis var. subtuberculata G. Nevill, 1885 (junior synonym)
 Melania variabilis var. subvaricosa G. Nevill, 1885 (junior synonym)
 Melania varicosa Troschel, 1837

References

 Köhler F. & Glaubrecht M. (2001) Toward a systematic revision of the southeast Asian freshwater gastropod Brotia H. Adams, 1866 (Cerithioidea: Pachychylidae): An account of species from around the South China Sea. Journal of Molluscan Studies 67: 281-318.

External links
 Rafinesque, C. S. (1833). On 5 new fresh water shells, of Bengal and Assam in Asia. Atlantic Journal and Friend of Knowledge. 5: 165−170
 Benson, W. H. (1836). Descriptive catalogue of a collection of land and fresh-water shells, chiefly contained in the Museum of the Asiatic Society. Journal of the Asiatic Society of Bengal. 5(59): 741–750
 Griffith E. & Pidgeon E. (1833-1834). The Mollusca and Radiata. Vol. 12, In: E. Griffith, [1824−1835, The Animal Kingdom arranged in conformity with its organization, by the Baron Cuvier, London: Whittaker and Co., viii + 601 pp., 61 pls]
 Lea, I. (1838). Description of new freshwater and land shells. Transactions of the American Philosophical Society. new ser., 6: 1-154, plates 1-24
 Troschel, F. H. (1837). Neue Süßwasser-Conchylien aus dem Ganges. Archiv für Naturgeschichte. 3: 166–182
 Lea, I. (1857). Description of fifteen new species of exotic Melaniana. Proceedings of the Academy of Natural Sciences of Philadelphia. 8(4): 144-145
 Lea, 1843) Lea, I. (1843). On fresh water shells (continuation) [sixteen new species of the family Melanianae. Proceedings of the American Philosophical Society. 2(24): 241-243]
 Nevill G. (1885). Hand List of Mollusca in the Indian Museum, Calcutta. Part II. Gastropoda. Prosobranchia-Neurobranchia (contd.). x + 306 pp. Office of Superintendent of Government Printing, Calcutta
 Martin K. (1895-1906). Die Fossilien von Java auf grund einer Sammlung von Dr. R. D. M. Verbeek. I. Band. Gasteropoda. Sammlungen des Geologischen Reichs-Museums in Leiden. new ser., 1: 1-132, pls 1-20
 Köhler, F.; Glaubrecht, M. (2006). A systematic revision of the southeast Asian freshwater gastropod Brotia (Cerithioidea: Pachychilidae). Malacologia. 48(1−2): 159−251

costula
Gastropods described in 1833